Michael Ludwig Hariyanto Arbi (born 21 January 1972) is a former badminton player from Indonesia who rated among the world's top few singles players in the 1990s. He is the younger brother of Eddy Hartono and Hastomo, who were also world class badminton players.

Career 
The hard smashing Arbi was arguably the most internationally successful of an impressive cadre of Indonesian singles players who were his contemporaries. These included Ardy Wiranata, Joko Suprianto, Alan Budikusuma, Hermawan Susanto, and Hendrawan. Curiously he never won the open singles title of Indonesia which Wiranata dominated in the nineties. This and the Olympic gold medal were about the only prizes that eluded him after eliminated in the bronze medal match in 1996. He won the coveted All England Open singles title in 1993 and 1994, and the then biennial IBF World Championship in 1995. Arbi played singles for Indonesian teams that won consecutive Thomas Cup (world men's team) titles in 1994, 1996, 1998, and 2000.

Arbi's other individual victories included the Chinese Taipei Open (1993, 1994), Japan Open (1993, 1995), World Cup (1994), Hong Kong Open (1995), Korea Open (1995), Singapore Open (1997, 1999), Southeast Asian Games (1997) and the badminton competition at the quadrennial Asian Games (1994).

Achievements

World Championships 
Men's singles

World Cup 
Men's singles

World Masters Games 

Men's singles

Men's doubles

Mixed doubles

World Senior Championships 

Men's doubles

Asian Games 
Men's singles

Asian Cup 
Men's singles

Southeast Asian Games 
Men's singles

World Junior Championships 
The Bimantara World Junior Championships was an international invitation badminton tournament for junior players. It was held in Jakarta, Indonesia from 1987 to 1991.

Boys' singles

IBF World Grand Prix (12 titles, 7 runners-up) 
The World Badminton Grand Prix sanctioned by International Badminton Federation (IBF) since 1983.

Men's singles

 IBF Grand Prix tournament
 IBF Grand Prix Finals tournament

IBF International (1 runner-up) 

Men's singles

Invitational tournaments 
Men's singles

References 

1972 births
Living people
Sportspeople from Central Java
Indonesian people of Chinese descent
Indonesian male badminton players
Badminton players at the 1996 Summer Olympics
Olympic badminton players of Indonesia
Badminton players at the 1994 Asian Games
Asian Games gold medalists for Indonesia
Asian Games medalists in badminton
Medalists at the 1994 Asian Games
Competitors at the 1993 Southeast Asian Games
Competitors at the 1997 Southeast Asian Games
Southeast Asian Games gold medalists for Indonesia
Southeast Asian Games silver medalists for Indonesia
Southeast Asian Games medalists in badminton
World No. 1 badminton players
Indonesian businesspeople
Politicians from Central Java